Théophile Huyge (born 8 November 1920) was a Belgian weightlifter. He competed in the men's lightweight event at the 1948 Summer Olympics.

References

External links
  

1920 births
Possibly living people
Belgian male weightlifters
Olympic weightlifters of Belgium
Weightlifters at the 1948 Summer Olympics
Sportspeople from East Flanders
20th-century Belgian people